Cigall Kadoch (born 1985) is an American biochemist and cancer biologist who is Associate Professor of Pediatric Oncology at the Dana–Farber Cancer Institute and Harvard Medical School. Her research is focused in chromatin regulation and how changes in cellular structure can lead to human diseases, such as Cancer, Neurodevelopmental disorders, and others. She is internationally recognized for her work on the mammalian SWI/SNF complex, a large molecular machine known as a Chromatin remodeling complex. She was named as one of the world's leading scientists by MIT Technology Review, 35 Under 35 and Forbes 30 Under 30, and a Finalist for the Blavatnik Awards for Young Scientists. In 2019, she received the Martin and Rose Wachtel Cancer Research Prize from the American Association for the Advancement of Science and in 2020, the American Association for Cancer Research Outstanding Achievement in Basic Cancer Research Award.

Early life and education 
Kadoch was born and raised in Marin County, California, just north of San Francisco. As a teenager, she lost a close family friend to late-stage breast cancer, which inspired her to learn more about the disease. Kadoch eventually studied molecular and cellular biology at the University of California, Berkeley. She moved to Stanford University as a graduate student, where she specialized in cancer biology under the supervision of developmental biologist Gerald Crabtree. Her doctoral research considered chromatin remodeling in human malignancy. Whilst completing her doctorate, she identified a relationship between the SWI/SNF (BAF) chromatin remodeling protein complex and synovial sarcoma. After completing her doctorate at Stanford University she transitioned directly to faculty at Dana–Farber Cancer Institute and Harvard Medical School.

Research and career 
In 2014, at the age of 28, Kadoch established her independent laboratory at the Dana–Farber Cancer Institute and Harvard Medical School, as an Assistant Professor. She was one of the youngest faculty members to achieve such status. She has since studied mammalian SWI/SNF complexes in an effort to develop new therapeutic strategies.

The SWI/SNF complexes serve to open and close DNA, altering which genes are expressed at particular times. Kadoch's work showed that mutations in the SWI/SNF (BAF) protein complex are involved in over 20% of human cancers. Further, Kadoch identified that 100% of synovial sarcoma tumors have defects in one particular subunit of SWI/SNF complex, which drives disease pathogenesis. The fusion oncoprotein subunit, SS18-SSX, appears to break the guidance system of SWI/SNF (BAF), targeting it aberrantly on chromatin and activating genes that support cancer development. In lab-based experiments, Kadoch showed that it was possible to use healthy subunits to repair the complex and kill the cancerous cells.

In 2016, Kadoch's research resulted in the formation of Foghorn Therapeutics, a biotechnology company that seeks to build novel therapeutic strategies based on the chromatin regulatory system. The spin-out company launched on the Nasdaq in 2020, with a $120 million initial public offering.

Awards and honors 
 NIH Director's New Innovator Award
 Pew Scholar Award
 American Cancer Society Research Scholar Award
 American Association for the Advancement of Sciences Marin and Rose Wachtel Cancer Research Prize
 American Association for Cancer Research Outstanding Achievement Award
 American Society for Cell Biology Early Career Life Scientist Award
 Forbes 30 under 30 List
 MIT Technology Review 35 Innovators Under 35
 Popular Science Brilliant 10
 Business Insider Top 30 Young leaders in Biopharma
 Blavatnik National Awards Finalist

Selected publications

References

External links 

1986 births
Living people